The Philidor Defence (or Philidor's Defence) is a chess opening characterised by the moves:

1. e4 e5
2. Nf3 d6

The opening is named after the famous 18th-century player François-André Danican Philidor, who advocated it as an alternative to the common 2...Nc6. His original idea was to challenge White's  by the pawn thrust ...f7–f5.

Today, the Philidor is known as a  but passive choice for Black, and is seldom seen in top-level play except as an alternative to the heavily analysed openings that can ensue after the normal 2...Nc6. It is considered a good opening for amateur players who seek a defensive strategy that is simpler and easier to understand than the complex positions that result from an opening such as the French Defence.

The Encyclopaedia of Chess Openings code for Philidor Defence is C41.

Use
The Philidor occurred in one of the most famous games ever played, "The Opera Game" played in 1858 between the American chess master Paul Morphy and two strong amateurs, the German noble Duke Karl of Brunswick and the French aristocrat Count Isouard. The game continued 3.d4 Bg4, a deviation from modern standard lines. The Philidor Defence declined in popularity as  became more developed, and it had almost completely vanished from top-tier chess by World War I.

, there are no top players who employ the Philidor with regularity, although Étienne Bacrot and Liviu-Dieter Nisipeanu have occasionally experimented with it in classical play. Its popularity in master play has increased slightly, however, over the last 20 years. It has also become fairly popular in rapid, blitz, and bullet chess.

Main line: 3.d4 
Black has several options.

3...exd4
The most common Black response is 3...exd4 which relieves the central , although it gives up the centre. After 4.Nxd4 Nf6 (4...d5 5.exd5, the Paulsen Attack, continues 5...Qxd5 6.Qe2+ Be7 7.Nb5 Na6 8.N1c3 Paulsen) 5.Nc3, Black normally continues ...Be7 and ...0-0 (the Antoshin Variation) and achieves a strong defensive position.

In this line Black can also fianchetto his bishop to g7, although this is uncommon. Bent Larsen tried this in a few games, including a draw against Mikhail Tal in 1969.

Instead of 4.Nxd4, White can play 4.Qxd4, as Paul Morphy favoured, intending 4...Nc6 5.Bb5 Bd7 6.Bxc6 Bxc6 7.Nc3 Nf6 8.Bg5 followed by 0-0-0. This line was played in many 19th-century games.

Hanham Variation

The other main option for Black is to maintain the central tension and adopt a setup with ...Nd7, ...Be7, and ...c6. This plan is named the Hanham Variation (after the American chess master James Moore Hanham) and was favoured by Aron Nimzowitsch. A common line is: 3...Nf6 4.Nc3 Nbd7 5.Bc4 Be7 6.0-0 (6.Ng5 is an interesting alternative: after 6...0-0 7.Bxf7+ Rxf7 8.Ne6 Qe8 9.Nxc7 Qd8 10.Nxa8, White is up , but Black can develop a strong initiative after, for example, 10...b5 11.Nxb5 Qa5+) 6...0-0 7.a4 (to prevent ...b5) c6 (see diagram).

Grandmaster (GM) Larry Kaufman notes that the Hanham Variation aims to maintain Black's pawn on e5, analogously to closed lines of the Ruy Lopez, and opines that "it would be quite popular and on a par with the major defences to 1.e4, except for the annoying detail that Black can't actually reach the Hanham position by force."

As an alternative to 4.Nc3 in response to Black's 3...Nf6, according to both Kaufman and GM Christian Bauer, White retains some advantage with: 4.dxe5 Nxe4 5.Qd5! (the Rellstab Variation; 5.Nbd2 is the Sokolsky Variation) 5...Nc5 6.Bg5 Be7 7.exd6 Qxd6 8.Nc3.

Alternative move order
Black sometimes tries 3...Nd7 intending 4.Nc3 Ngf6, reaching the Hanham Variation. But then 4.Bc4! is awkward for Black to meet, since 4...Ngf6 loses to 5.Ng5, and 4...Be7 loses a pawn to 5.dxe5 Nxe5 (5...dxe5 6.Qd5! wins) 6.Nxe5 dxe5 7.Qh5! So 4...c6 is best for Black, but leaves White with the advantage of the  after 5.0-0 Be7 6.dxe5 dxe5 (6...Nxe5 loses a pawn to 7.Nxe5 dxe5 8.Qh5) 7.Ng5! Bxg5 8.Qh5! Qe7 and now 9.Bxg5 or 9.Qxg5.

Black experiments to reach the Hanham Variation
In recent years, Black has experimented with other  in an attempt to reach the Hanham Variation while avoiding 3...Nf6 4.dxe5! and 3...Nd7 4.Bc4! 
One such line is 1.e4 d6 2.d4 Nf6 3.Nc3 Nbd7 intending 4.Nf3 e5. White can deviate, however, with 4.f4 or even 4.g4!? 
Another try is 1.e4 d6 2.d4 Nf6 3.Nc3 e5 which transposes to the Hanham after 4.Nf3 Nbd7, but White can instead try to gain a small advantage with 4.dxe5 (Kaufman opines that 4.Nge2 is "also promising") 4...dxe5 5.Qxd8+ Kxd8 6.Bc4. After 4.dxe5, Bauer concludes that "White stands a trifle better", but that "provided he plays accurately, Black doesn't have much to fear following 6.Bc4, by choosing any of the three valid replies, 6...Ke8, 6...Bb4, or 6...Be6. Then 7.Bxe6 fxe6 his position remains a hard nut to crack."

Philidor Countergambit: 3...f5 

A more aggressive approach for Black after 3.d4 is 3...f5 (diagram), Philidor's original intention and recommendation. In the 19th century, 3...f5 was also played by Paul Morphy. The move can lead to more  than the other lines, but is often considered dubious. Others maintain that 3...f5 is a valid idea. GM Tony Kosten considers the move respectable in his monograph on the opening. The move was also played by David Bronstein and by Teimour Radjabov.

After 3...f5 White has several ways to proceed:
4.Nc3 (the Zukertort Variation) and White obtains a clear advantage:
4...fxe4 5.Nxe4 d5 (if 5...Nf6 6.Nxf6 gxf6 7.dxe5 fxe5 8.Bc4 Qf6 9.Ng5 Polugaevsky) 6.Nxe5 dxe4 7.Qh5+ g6 8.Nxg6 Nf6 (if 8...hxg6 9.Qxh8 Be6 10.Qe5+/− Larsen) 9.Qe5+ Kf7 (if 9...Be7 10.Nxh8 Nc6 11.Bb5 Qd5 12.Bg5+/− Zukertort) 10.Bc4+ Kg7 11.Bh6+ Kxh6 12.Nxh8 Bb4+ 13.c3 Qxh8 14.cxb4+/− (Keres). 
4...exd4 5.Qxd4 fxe4 (if 5...Nf6 6.e5!) 6.Bg5 Nf6 7.Nxe4 Be7 8.Bc4 Nc6 9.Qe3+/− (Sozin).
4...Nf6 5.dxe5 Nxe4 6.Nxe4 fxe4 7.Ng5 d5 8.e6 Bc5 9.Nxe4!+/− (Sozin, Sokolsky).
4.Bc4 leads to clear advantage for White:
4...exd4 5.Ng5 Nh6 6.0-0 (6.Nxh7, the Jaenisch Variation, leads to an  position after 6...Ng4! 7.Nxf8 Kxf8 8.Qxd4 Nc6) 6...Nc6 7.Re1 f4 (or 7...fxe4 8.Nxe4 Ne5 9.Bxh6 gxh6 10.f4 Nxc4 11.Nxd6+ +/−) 8.Bxf4 Qf6 9.Qd2 Ne5 10.Be2 Bg4 11.f3 Bd7 12.Bg3 0-0-0 13.f4+/−.  
4...Nf6 5.Ng5 Qe7 (or 5...d5 6.dxe5 dxc4 7.Qxd8+ Kxd8 8.exf6+/−) 6.Bf7+ Kd8 7.Bb3 exd4 8.0-0+/− (Berger).
4...fxe4 5.Nxe5 d5 6.Qh5+ g6 7.Nxg6 Nf6 8.Qe5+ Be7 and continuing either 9.Qxe7+, 9.Nxh8 (Steinitz), or 9.Bb5+ (Keres).
4.dxe5 forces Black to complicate matters further with 4...fxe4 5.Ng5 d5 with an unclear position. 
After 6.e6 (the del Rio Attack), White obtains the upper hand after 6...Bc5 7.Nc3 (the Berger Variation), or 6...Nh6 7.Nc3! (Berger); however, Black can maintain lack of clarity with 6...Nf6!? 7.Nf7 Qe7 8.Nxh8 Bxe6, or 6...Bb4+ 7.c3 Bc5 8.Nf7 Qf6 9.Be3 Bxe6 10.Nxh8 Bxe3 11.fxe3 Qh4+ 12.g3 Qh6 13.Qd2 Nd7 14.c4 Ne5 15.Be2 dxc4 16.Nc3 Nd3+ 17.Bxd3 exd3 (Makarov).
White also has 6.Nc3!? (Steinitz) and 6.c4.        
4.exf5 e4 5.Ng5 Bxf5 6.Nc3 and White has a slight plus after 6...Nf6 7.f3 (Sozin), or 6...d5 7.f3.

3...Bg4?!
Black cannot block the attack on the f7-pawn with the "natural" 6...Nf6? because White wins a pawn with 7.Qb3 (played in the famous "Opera Game", where Morphy as White refrained from taking the b7-pawn and retained a strong  after 7...Qe7 8.Nc3). Black does better with 6...Qf6 7.Qb3 Bc5 8.0-0 Bb6 9.a4 a5 10.Nc3 Ne7 11.Be3 Nd7 12.Rad1+/−, or 6...Qd7!? (Maróczy).

Other 3rd moves for White
An alternative approach for White is 3.Bc4, delaying d2–d4, or forgoing it entirely, playing d2–d3 instead. The move 3.Bc4 is also White's route to a possible Légal Trap. Some continuations: 
3...Nc6  to the Semi-Italian Opening.  
3...f5 is the López Countergambit: 
4.d4 transposes to the Philidor Countergambit. 
Or unique positions can be obtained such as 4.d3 c6, possibly followed by ...f5–f4, ...b7–b5, ...a7–a5, and even ...g7–g5 and ...h7–h5, where all black pawns have moved before any piece.
Or Black can try 3...Be7!? e.g. 4.0-0 (4.c3 is the Steinitz Variation) Nf6 5.Re1 0-0 6.d4 exd4 7.Nxd4 a6.

See also
List of chess openings
List of chess openings named after people

References

Bibliography

Further reading

External links

Opening overview
Shirov's 5.g4!? gambit in the Philidor

Chess openings